The Bhusawal–Kalyan section is part of the Howrah–Nagpur–Mumbai line and Howrah–Allahabad–Mumbai line. It connects Bhusawal and Kalyan both in the Indian state of Maharashtra. One of the branch lines, Jalgaon–Surat line, runs partly in Gujarat.

Geography
Part of some of the major trunk lines in the country, this line passes through a section of the Deccan Plateau, starting with Khandesh, It crosses the Western Ghats across the Thul Ghat and enters the Western Coastal Plains.

Thul Ghat
Thul Ghat (incline) is a series of mountain slopes in the Western Ghats traversed by this line. The line negotiates this steep incline with the help of curves. According to IRFCA, "The viaduct is situated in a steep valley nestling in the midst of hills that skirt around it in the tunnels and then is carried across the yawning chasm on a tall imposing structure… Some of the viaducts and tunnels on this line are considered outstanding achievements in Civil Engineering and are among the finest works in the world."

Economy
This line serves two coal-based thermal power stations: the 880 MW Nashik Thermal Power Station of Mahagenco and 850 MW Ukai Thermal Power Station of Gujarat State Electricity Corporation Limited. Nasik TPS consumed 4,626,000 tonnes of coal in 2006–07 and Ukai TPS consumed 3,200,000 tonnes the same year. Coal transportation forms 42 per cent of the total freight earnings of Indian railways.

History

Main line
The first train in India traveled from Chhatrapati Shivaji Terminus railway station in Mumbai, then known as Boribunder, to Thane on 16 April 1853. Within about a year Great Indian Peninsula Railway connected the  Mumbai–Thane line to Kalyan. Service up to Igatpuri (across the Thul Ghat) was started in 1865. Before that, Bhusawal station was set up in 1860 and most of the line between Bhusawal and Igatpuri was laid in 1861-62 but the line was activated in mid-1860s, after completion of the line across Thul Ghat.

Branch lines
The  Tapti Valley Railway linked Surat, on the Bombay, Baroda and Central India Railway, to the Great Indian Peninsula system at Amalner in the Khandesh region, in 1900. It was one of the railways set up by Killick Nixon Limited.

The  Manmad–Daund line was opened in 1878 and connects the two main sections (the south-east and north east) of GIPR. The line is being doubled.

The Hyderabad–Godavari Valley Railways opened the  Manmad–Secunderabad line (not shown in the route chart) in 1900.

The  Chalisgaon–Dhule line was opened in 1900.

The Pachora–Jamner  narrow-gauge line was opened by Central Province Railway in 1919.

Shirdi
The -long -wide broad-gauge Puntamba-Shirdi link, connecting Shirdi to the Manmad–Daund branch line was completed in 2009. The Manmad–Puntamba–Sainagar Shirdi line was electrified in 2011–12.

New lines
Indian Railways have cleared the construction of Manmad–Indore and Nashik–Pune new lines after sixteen years of active lobbying.

Railway reorganisation
The Great Indian Peninsula Railway was taken over by the state in 1925. In 1951, the Great Indian Peninsula Railway, the Nizam's Guaranteed State Railway, the Scindia State Railways  and the Dholpur Railways were merged to form Central Railway. In the same year, the Bombay, Baroda and Central India Railway, the Saurashtra Railway, the Rajasthan Railway, the Jaipur Railway and the Cutch State Railway were merged to form Western Railway.

Electrification and electric loco sheds
The Kalyan–Igatpuri section was electrified with 1.5 kV DC overhead system in 1929. Subsequent electrification with 25 kV AC overhead system in the Igatpuri–Manmad sector, with AC/DC change over at Igatpuri, was carried out in 1967–69. The Manmad–Bhusawal sector was electrified in 1968–69. The change over of mainlines in the Mumbai area from DC to AC traction was completed in June 2015.

There are large loco sheds at Bhusawal and Kalyan, and the smaller trip sheds at Manmad and Igatpuri. The loco shed at Bhusawal was established by the Great Indian Peninsula Railway in 1919. At that time it was the largest in Asia and third-largest in the world.  WAM-4, WAP- 4, WAG-5, WAG-7, WCM-6, WCG-2, WCAM-3 and WCAG-1 electric locomotives find a place in these sheds. Kalyan also houses some diesel locomotives.

Speed limits
The entire Howrah–Nagpur–Mumbai line is classified as a "Group A" line which can take speeds up to 160 km/h. The branch lines have speed limits within 100 km/h.

Passenger movement
Bhusawal and Manmad on this line, are amongst the top hundred booking stations of Indian Railway.

The tourist train Deccan Odyssey passes through a part of the route.

References

External links

 Trains at Bhusawal
 Trains at Manmad
 Trains at Kalyan

5 ft 6 in gauge railways in India
Rail transport in Maharashtra

Transport in Bhusawal
Transport in Kalyan-Dombivli